The Men's 200 metre individual medley event at the 2010 Commonwealth Games took place on 8 October 2010, at the SPM Swimming Pool Complex.

Three heats were held, with most containing the maximum number of swimmers (eight). The top eight from there qualified for the finals.

Heats

Heat 1

Heat 2

Heat 3

Final

References

Aquatics at the 2010 Commonwealth Games